The United Arab Emirates Armed Forces are the armed forces of the United Arab Emirates. The armed forces have been deployed in military and humanitarian missions. Owing to their "active and effective military role despite their small personnel", the United Arab Emirates Armed Forces have been nicknamed "Little Sparta" by United States Armed Forces General and former US defense secretary James Mattis.

History

The United Arab Emirates military was formed from the Trucial Oman Levies which was established on 11 May 1951 and were renamed the Trucial Oman Scouts in 1956. The Trucial Oman Scouts were turned over to the United Arab Emirates as the nucleus of its defense forces in 1971 with the formation of UAE and were absorbed into a united military called the Union Defence Force (UDF). The Union Defence Force was established officially as the military of the United Arab Emirates on 27 December 1971 from a directive issued by Zayed bin Sultan Al Nahyan.

As the Union Defence Force, every emirate was responsible for the equipment and training of its own defence forces. In the event of an attack on any one of the seven emirates, the Union Defence Force would be mobilized from every emirate to defend the emirate under attack. In 1974 the name was changed to the Federal Armed F0orces. On 6 May 1976, the Federal Armed Forces were unified as a single body. May 6 is celebrated annually as the Military Union Day. As a result of the union of forces, the number of personnel formed a brigade and was referred to as the Yarmouk Brigade.

After the union of the armed forces in 1976, the Yarmouk Brigade was officially renamed the United Arab Emirates Armed Forces. In 1976 the official UAE Armed Forces insignia, uniform, military academies, air force, and naval force were established and the military General Headquarters (GHQ) was formed in Abu Dhabi.

UAE Armed Forces are equipped with weapon systems purchased from a variety of outside countries, including France, the United States and the United Kingdom. Some officers are graduates of the United Kingdom's Royal Military Academy at Sandhurst, with others having attended the United States Military Academy at West Point, the Royal Military College, Duntroon, and St Cyr, the military academy of France.

The United Arab Emirates Armed Forces participated in multiple conflicts, including the ones in the Middle East. From 1977-1979 the UAE Army contributed 750 men to the Arab Deterrent Force peacekeeping mission in Lebanon. During 1990–1991, the Armed Forces participated in the first Gulf War. 10 UAE soldiers lost their lives in liberating Kuwait. UAE Armed Forces were deployed in Eastern Europe and joined NATO's Kosovo Force peacekeeping mission undertaking aid missions to thousands of fleeing refugees on the Albanian border. This was the first time UAE troops uniform was switched to the woodland camouflage compared to their home desert camouflage. UAE Armed Forces participated in the peacekeeping mission in  Somalia from 1993-94. The UAE Presidential Guards were deployed to maintain security in War in Afghanistan against the Taliban. In March 2011, UAE joined the enforcement of the no-fly-zone over Libya by sending six F-16 and six Mirage 2000 multi-role fighter aircraft and in 2015 joined the Saudi-led coalition intervention in Yemen by sending 30 UAEAF F16 Desert Falcons to Yemen. The intervention was followed by UAE ground troops deployment in Southern Yemen focusing on targeting "terrorist" cells such as Al-Qaeda in the Arabian Peninsula and Islamic State.

UAE introduced a mandatory military conscription for adult males in 2014 of 16 months to expand its reserve force. The date of the first death in the line of duty of an UAE soldier was on 30 November 1971 during the Seizure of Abu Musa and the Greater and Lesser Tunbs as is celebrated annually as the Commemoration Day. The highest loss of life in the history of the UAE military occurred on Friday 4 September 2015 when 52 soldiers were killed in Marib area of Yemen by a Tochka missile which targeted a weapons cache and caused an explosion. Names of UAE soldiers who died in the line of duty are inscribed in the UAE Armed Forces memorial, the Oasis of Dignity, in Abu Dhabi.

The UAE outsourced much of its military to foreign mercenaries and advisers. A report released in October 2022 revealed that several retired US military personnel work as military contractors or consultants for the UAE. The report obtained through the Freedom of Information Act revealed that in seven years nearly 280 American military veterans sought federal permission to work for the Emirates. Hundreds of US military veterans were also known to have been hired by the UAE government or state-owned firms. Experts claimed that the Emirati military was the Arab world's most powerful due to influx of American veterans. UAE ambassador to the US, Yousef Al Otaiba said the US played a crucial role in the Emirates' progress and security. However, the extent of Emirati dependence on the US military contractors is not fully known.

Branches

Air Force

The United Arab Emirates Air Force has about 4,000 personnel as of 2017. The air force agreed in 1999 to purchase 80 US F-16 multirole fighter aircraft. Other equipment includes 60 Mirage 2000s, British Hawk aircraft, and French helicopters. The air defense has a Hawk missile program for which the United States has been training. UAE has taken delivery of two of five Triad I-Hawk batteries.
United Arab Emirates Air Defence Force is responsible for civil defense aircraft and protecting the country's airspace.

Army

As part of the military of United Arab Emirates, the Army (called Land Forces in Arabic) is responsible for land and ground based operations.
Medical Corps form part of the Army and are responsible for military medical support to the rest of UAE Armed Forces.

Navy

The United Arab Emirates Navy consisted of more than 2,000 personnel and 72 vessels.

United Arab Emirates Marines – UAE maintained a battalion-sized Marine force called UAE Marines until 2011 when it was merged into UAE-PG.
United Arab Emirates Coast Guard – a coast guard agency of United Arab Emirates and is primarily responsible for the protection of UAE coastline through regulation of maritime laws, maintenance of seamarks, border control, anti-smuggling operations and other services.

Presidential Guard

The United Arab Emirates Presidential Guard (UAE-PG) was formed in 2011 by merging the Amiri Guard, Special Operations Command, and the Marine Battalion from the UAE Navy.  UAE requested training support be provide by the U.S. Marine Corps (USMC). The U.S. State Department approved a foreign military sales (FMS) Training Case for UAE-PG in October 2011. Marine Corps Training Mission UAE (MCTM-UAE) operates under chief of mission authority as a Title 22 FMS training case.

Deployments

Gulf War

UAE sent forces to assist Kuwait during the 1990–1991 Gulf War where some hundred UAE troops participated in the conflict as part of the GCC Peninsula Shield force that advanced into Kuwait City. UAE air force carried out strikes against Iraqi forces. UAE Armed Forces participated in the coalition with an army battalion along with a squadron of Dassault Mirage 5 and Mirage 2000. 6 UAE troops were killed in action.

United Nations Operation in Somalia II

UAE Armed Forces participated in UNOSOM II which was an intervention launched in March 1993 until March 1995, and committed resources to the United Nations mission.

Lebanon

UAE Military field engineers arrived in Lebanon at 8 September 2007 in Beirut for clearing areas of south Lebanon from mines and cluster bombs.

War in Afghanistan

UAE Armed Forces were deployed in 2003 to Afghanistan mainly to support construction. UAE special forces would establish fire support base around UAE supported projects which included funding tarmac roads, clinics, a Pashtun radio station and a mast provided by Etisalat which provided competition for other mobile networks in Helmand. Their activities include driving into "remote and impoverished" Afghan villages, distributing aid and sitting down with the village "elders" to inquire about their needs. They would then fund projects while the contracts went out to local tender. UAE Armed Forces used their ties to Islam and ability to fund projects to try to reduce the local suspicion of NATO in Afghanistan.

Saudi led intervention in Yemen

In 2015, UAE participated in the Saudi Arabian-led intervention in Yemen to influence the outcome of the Yemeni Civil War (2015–). On 4 September 2015, 52 UAE soldiers (together with 10 Saudi and 5 Bahraini soldiers) were killed when a Houthi missile hit an ammunition dump at a military base in Ma'rib Governorate, marking the "highest death toll on the battlefield in the country's history".

In 2016, during the Battle of Mukalla, UAE Armed Forces liberated the port of Mukalla from AQAP forces in 36 hours after being held by AQAP for more than a year with the US defense secretary James Mattis calling the UAE led operation a model for American troops. In 2018, the Associated Press in a report mentioned that UAE struck deals with AQAP militants by recruiting them against fighting the Houthis and providing them with money. The report continued to state that the United States was aware of Al-Qaeda joining ranks with UAE and has held off drone strikes against Al-Qaeda. UAE Brigadier General Musallam Al Rashidi responded to the report by stating that Al Qaeda cannot be reasoned with in the first place stating that "There's no point in negotiating with these guys." The UAE military stated that accusations of allowing AQAP to leave with cash contradicts its primary objective of depriving AQAP of its financial strength. The notion of Al Qaeda joining ranks with UAE Armed Forces and the United States holding off drone strikes against Al Qaeda has been denied by The Pentagon with Colonel Robert Manning, spokesperson of the Pentagon, calling the news source "patently false". According to The Independent, AQAP activity on social media as well as the number of reported attacks conducted by it has decreased since UAE intervention.

On 30 April 2018 the UAE armed forces, as part of the Saudi-led intervention in Yemen, landed troops on the island of Socotra. The Independent newspaper reported that UAE has politically annexed the island and built a communications network, and conducted census and provided Socotra residents with free healthcare and work permits in Abu Dhabi. On 14 May 2018, a deal was brokered between UAE and Yemen for a joint military training exercise and the return of administrative control of Socotra's airport and seaport to Yemen.

In June 2018, an offensive was carried out by UAE-led troops in Hodeidah.

In June 2019, UAE announced a partial withdrawal of its troops by reducing armed forces fighting in Yemen. An official from UAE called the move a "strategic" redeployment. According to a Reuters report, the gulf nation ordered the withdrawal of its troops following security concerns, after tensions with Iran. UAE stated that it is shifting its focus from Houthi rebels to ISIS and al-Qaeda in Yemen.

Islamic State
In 2015, UAE Air Force dropped bombs on Islamic State targets in Syria. One of them was Major Mariyam Al Mansouri, the first female UAE Air Force pilot.

Expansion

In 1989, UAE purchased Scud-B ballistic missiles from North Korea.
UAE went on an expansion drive in 1995, which began with the 1992–93 acquisition of 436 Leclerc tanks and 415 BMP-3 armoured vehicles. It had learned from the Iranian experiences with having a single supplier for its military and has diversified its arms purchases, purchasing weaponry mainly from Russia, the United States, the UK, Ukraine, France, Italy and Germany. It has also taken care to invest in the systems it has purchased and standardise them according to NATO/GCC Specifications. The equipment purchases was also followed by a programme to increase manpower numbers and Emiratisation programme for the Armed forces.

In 2008, UAE bought MIM-104 Patriot missiles and related radar, support services for the Patriot systems.

In 2011, during a war scare with Iran over the Straits of Hormuz, UAE announced a purchase of US$3.48 billion worth of American missile systems: 2 radar systems, 96 missiles, spare parts and training. UAE was the first country to acquire the Terminal High Altitude Area Defense System (THAAD). A contract worth $1.96 billion was agreed for Lockheed Martin Corp to supply two Thaad anti-missile batteries.

In November 2019, South Africa blocked supply of arms to United Arab Emirates, Oman, Algeria, and Saudi Arabia following a dispute in the inspection clause of its agreement. According to a report by Reuters, UAE and the other mentioned countries refused to allow officials from South Africa to inspect their facilities. The dispute arose as UAE and the other countries refused the inspections, stating it violated their sovereignty. According to the industry, the inspection row puts business at risk and could cause the loss of up to 9,000 jobs at defense firms and supporting industries in South Africa. UAE began firing trials with China, India, and Serbia to replace the South African RDM as preferred supplier of ammunition.

Industry

The Abu Dhabi Shipbuilding company (ADSB) produces a range of ships and is a contractor in the Baynunah Programme, a programme to design develop and produce 5–6 corvettes customised for operation in the waters of the Persian Gulf. It has produced ammunition, military transport vehicles and unmanned aerial vehicles.

A joint venture agreement was signed in Abu Dhabi on 28 November 2007 between Tawazun Holding LLC, an investment company established by the Offset Program Bureau (OPB), Al-Jaber Trading Establishment, part of Al-Jaber Group, and Rheinmetall Munitions Systems, to set up the Al-Burkan munition factory at the Zayed Military City in Abu Dhabi. OPB signed four Memorandums of Understanding with companies from Europe and Singapore at the Paris Eurosatory 2008 defence exhibition on June 20, Rheinmetall Group and Diehl Defence Holding of Germany, Singapore Technologies Engineering (ST Engg), and Thales of France.

Tawazun has partnered with Saab on radar development.

References

Further reading

External links

UAE Ministry of Defence

United Arab Emirates
War scare